Cheung Sok is a small island to the north of Yam O Bay, Lantau Island, Hong Kong. It is part of the Tsuen Wan District.

See also

 List of islands and peninsulas of Hong Kong

References

Uninhabited islands of Hong Kong
Tsuen Wan District
Lantau Island
Islands of Hong Kong